The Albany Academies are independent college-preparatory schools in Albany, New York, educating students from Preschool through Grade 12. In July 2007, the administrative teams of The Albany Academy and Albany Academy for Girls merged into The Albany Academies. Both schools retain much of their pre-merger tradition and character and each continues to give diplomas under its own name. Administrative services are shared under The Albany Academies; Christopher J. Lauricella is Head of School. The 2022-2023 enrollment is 638 students distributed over 30 grade levels. (Preschool, Pre-K, K-12 boys, & Preschool, Pre-K, K-12 girls.) Of the 638 students, 323 were enrolled in The Albany Academy and 315 were enrolled in Albany Academy for Girls.

Accreditation and memberships
The Academies are accredited by the New York State Association of Independent Schools and recognized by the Regents of the State of New York.

The Academies are members of the following associations: the College Board, the Cum Laude Society, the National Association of Independent Schools, the Educational Records Bureau, the Capital Region Independent Schools Association, the Association of Boys' Schools, the Secondary Schools Admission Test Board, and the New England Prep School Athletic Association.

See also
The Albany Academy
Albany Academy for Girls
Albany, New York

External links

Education in Albany, New York
Preparatory schools in New York (state)
Private elementary schools in New York (state)
Private high schools in Albany County, New York
Private middle schools in New York (state)
Private schools in Capital District (New York)
Organizations based in Albany, New York